Valley High School (VHS) is a public school located in Las Vegas, Nevada that also offers three widely recognized magnet programs: the International Baccalaureate Diploma Programme and Middle Years Programme,  the Academy of Hospitality and Tourism (AOHT), and the MSTEM Program that was introduced in 2016 in Las Vegas, Nevada, U.S.A, which is a part of the Clark County School District.

History
Valley High School opened in the fall of 1965. The campus was designed by Zick & Sharp, and built by Del E. Webb Corporation.

On March 19, 1982 psychology and sociology teacher Clarence Piggott was shot to death and two students were wounded by 17-year-old student Patrick Lizotte. The shooter was later shot and wounded by police before his arrest. Lizotte was sentenced to two consecutive life sentences without the possibility of parole, but was granted parole on March 6, 2017 after a Nevada law banning life without parole for juveniles reduced his sentence to 20 years to life.

The U.S. men's Olympic basketball team held several practices in the gymnasium of Valley High School in June and July 2008 in preparation for the Beijing Olympics.

Academy of Hospitality and Tourism  
Valley High School is also home to the Academy of Hospitality and Tourism (AOHT) program, the oldest in the state.

International Baccalaureate Program 
Since September 1, 1979, Valley High School has been an authorized Middle Years Program and Diploma Program International Baccalaureate school. Valley High School is #140 on the International Baccalaureate list of schools around the globe.

Unlike the rest of the school, the International Baccalaureate Program at Valley High School has its own student governing body, named the Valley High School International Baccalaureate Council (VHSIBC or IBC). Ever since the authorization of Valley High School International Baccalaureate, the Valley High School International Baccalaureate Council aims to represent the students of the DP and MYP programs at Valley High School and in the greater community, extend the IB curriculum beyond the classroom, encourage and promote the advancement of the International Baccalaureate, cultivate and sponsor social and cultural events at the school, and to foster a positive impact with the community and with the students of the IB programs.

The IB Council is the responsible governing agency for the welfare of all International Baccalaureate students at Valley High School. The council operates on public meetings hosted weekly at the school, and is dictated by parliamentary procedures, CCSD regulations, Nevada Revised Statutes, International Baccalaureate Organization mandated regulations, and the IBC Official Constitution. The IB Council 2015-2016 is the first ever council to organize its structure based on its constitution, its democratic elections, and its administrative structure.

Athletics 
Valley High School's athletic program is known as the Vikings and competes in the Northeast Division of the Sunrise 4A Region.  Valley has historically had a prominent baseball program, producing Major Leaguers Mike Morgan, Matt DeWitt, Doug Mirabelli, Tyler Houston and Greg Maddux.

Nevada Interscholastic Activities Association State Championships 

Baseball - 1970, 1981, 1983, 1985, 1986, 1988, 1989
Basketball (Boys) - 1980-1983, 1998
Football - 1969, 1978
Track and Field (Boys) - 2009
Volleyball (Girls) - 1976, 1977
Tennis (Boys) 1976
Wrestling - 1973, 1974

Extracurricular Activities  
Valley High School is home to various clubs, organizations, and activities. The school's diverse community allows students to create clubs, different organizations, and various activities that both open engagement and opportunity to all students across campus.

Valley Key Club
Key Club International is the largest and oldest service program for high school students. It is a student-led organization that teaches leadership through service to others.

The Valley Key Club was chartered in 1981. It is sponsored by the Las Vegas Kiwanis. Valley Key Club is part of Division 28 East Pandas and Region 5 Zombie Penguins.

Valley High School Band 
The Valley High School Band, also known as the Vanguard, is the official marching band and pep band for the high school. In addition to these ensembles, the program offers students the opportunity to play in year round concert bands, jazz band, woodwind choir, brass choir, percussion ensemble, and winter guard.

Notable alumni
Shelley Berkley, congresswoman (D-NV)
Matt DeWitt, baseball pitcher, currently unsigned
Dayvid Figler, former Municipal Court judge and writer
Tony Fredianelli, former guitarist for Third Eye Blind
Tyler Houston, former Major League Baseball infielder
Greg Maddux, former Major League Baseball pitcher
Doug Mirabelli, former Major League Baseball catcher
Mike Morgan, former Major League Baseball pitcher
Steve Rodriguez, former Major League Baseball infielder, and current head coach of the Pepperdine University baseball team
Stevenson Sylvester, current NFL linebacker drafted by the Pittsburgh Steelers in the 5th round of the 2010 NFL Draft (166th overall)
Kerwynn Williams, current NFL running back

References

External links 
Valley High School Website
Clark County School District Website

High schools in Clark County, Nevada
Magnet schools in Nevada
Educational institutions established in 1965
Buildings and structures in Winchester, Nevada
Public high schools in Nevada
School buildings completed in 1965
1965 establishments in Wisconsin